Rhyssoplax suteri is a rare species of chiton in the family Chitonidae.

References
 Powell A. W. B., New Zealand Mollusca, William Collins Publishers Ltd, Auckland, New Zealand 1979 

Chitonidae
Chitons of New Zealand
Molluscs described in 1910